The Grand Cordon of the Order of Leopold is the highest and oldest rank of Chivalry and a formal diplomatic gift of the Kingdom of Belgium. This honour is bestowed very rarely in name of the Grand-Master, the King of the Belgians. This list is Chronological by official authorisation of the Royal Decree.

19th century

Leopold I, 1832-1865

Leopold II, 1865-1909

20th century

Albert I, 1909-1934

Leopold III 1934-1951

King Baudouin 1951-1993

King Albert II 1993-2013

21st Century

King Philippe (2013-)

Unknown

Books 
 F. Veldekens, Le livre d'or de l'ordre de Léopold et de la croix de fer (Brussels: Lelong, 1858–1861).

References

Leopold, List of Grand Cordons of the Order of
Grand Cordons
Belgium history-related lists
Belgium politics-related lists
Belgium diplomacy-related lists
Lists of state honours awarded to heads of state and royalty
Recipients of Belgian military awards and decorations
Political history of Belgium
Belgian monarchy